The following is a list of international prime ministerial trips made by prime ministers of India in reverse chronological order.

Narendra Modi (2014–present)

Manmohan Singh (2004–2014)

Atal Bihari Vajpayee (1998–2004)

Inder Kumar Gujral (April 1997 – March 1998)

H. D. Deve Gowda (June 1996 – April 1997)

P. V. Narasimha Rao  (1991–1996)

Chandra Shekhar (November 1990 – June 1991)

Vishwanath Pratap Singh (December 1989 – November 1990)

Rajiv Gandhi (1984–1989)

Charan Singh (1979–1980)
Charan Singh did not make any state visits as Prime Minister.

Morarji Desai (1977–1979)

Indira Gandhi (1966–77; 1980–84)

Lal Bahadur Shastri (1964–1966)

Jawaharlal Nehru (1947–1964)

References

 
Lists relating to prime ministers of India
India